Silvia Koeswandi (born 25 August 1959) is an Indonesian fencer. She competed in the women's individual foil event at the 1988 Summer Olympics.

References

External links
 

1959 births
Living people
Indonesian female foil fencers
Olympic fencers of Indonesia
Fencers at the 1988 Summer Olympics
Asian Games medalists in fencing
Fencers at the 1978 Asian Games
Fencers at the 1990 Asian Games
Asian Games silver medalists for Indonesia
Asian Games bronze medalists for Indonesia
Medalists at the 1978 Asian Games
Medalists at the 1990 Asian Games
Sportspeople from Makassar
20th-century Indonesian women